Nancy Rommelmann is an American journalist, book reviewer, and author.

Personal life
Rommelmann and her husband, Din Johnson, have lived in Portland, Oregon since 2004.

In September 2005, Rommelmann's husband, Din Johnson, opened a coffee shop, Ristretto Roasters, in Portland's Beaumont-Wilshire neighborhood. The shop grew into a small chain.

#MeNeither
Beginning in 2018, Rommelmann and columnist Leah McSweeney started the YouTube video series #MeNeither, defending prominent men accused of sexual assault and casting doubt on certain accusers' motives. A group of workers at the coffee company owned by Rommelmann's husband signed an open letter opposing her remarks amid media scrutiny of the company.

Books
To the Bridge, a True Story of Motherhood and Murder (2018), tells the nonfiction story of a mother in Portland, Oregon who dropped her small children off a high bridge to their death in an icy river.

The Bad Mother (2011), a novel,  followed "a cluster of street kids in L.A. as they make catastrophically bad choices."  A review in Reason described both Bad Mother and To the Bridge as storytelling that is "equal parts horrifying and lyrical."

The Queens of Montague Street (2012) is a memoir about growing up in Brooklyn Heights in the 1970s.

Transportation (2013) is a collection of Rommelmann's short stories.

Destination Gacy (2014) is an account of her cross-country journey to interview serial killer John Wayne Gacy shortly before his scheduled execution.

Rommelmann's Los Angeles Bar & Nightlife Guide (2001) is a guide to nightlife in Los Angeles.

She also wrote Everything You Pretend to Know About Food And Are Afraid Someone Will Ask (1998)

See also
 Me Too movement

References

Year of birth missing (living people)
Living people
American women journalists
American women non-fiction writers
21st-century American women